Ineson Glacier is a glacier flowing northwest into Gin Cove, James Ross Island, Antarctica. Following geological work by the British Antarctic Survey (BAS), 1981–83, it was named by the UK Antarctic Place-Names Committee after Jonathan R. Ineson, a BAS geologist in the area.

See also
 List of glaciers in the Antarctic
 Glaciology

References

 

Glaciers of James Ross Island